Žarko Petrović (Serbian Cyrillic: Жарко Петровић, October 27, 1964 – April 2, 2007) was a Serbian volleyball player who competed for Yugoslavia in the 1996 Summer Olympics.

He was born and died in Novi Sad.

In 1996 he was part of the Yugoslav team which won the bronze medal in the Olympic tournament. He played all eight matches.

References 
 

1964 births
2007 deaths
Serbian men's volleyball players
Serbia and Montenegro men's volleyball players
Yugoslav men's volleyball players
Volleyball players at the 1996 Summer Olympics
Olympic volleyball players of Yugoslavia
Olympic bronze medalists for Federal Republic of Yugoslavia
Olympic medalists in volleyball
Sportspeople from Novi Sad
Medalists at the 1996 Summer Olympics
Serbian expatriate sportspeople in Italy